The 12th Annual Premios Juventud (Youth Awards) were broadcast by Univision on July 16, 2015.

Winners and nominees

Music

Television

Movies

Sports

References 

Premios Juventud
Premios
Premios
Premios
Premios
Premios Juventud
Premios Juventud
2010s in Miami